Richard Joel Noriega (born January 8, 1958) is a former American politician and retired major general in the Texas Army National Guard who is currently director of Harris County Universal Services (HCUS). From 1998 to 2009, Noriega was a Democratic member of the Texas House of Representatives for District 145, representing eastern portions of Houston.

In 2008, Noriega was the Democratic nominee for the United States Senate seat held by Republican John Cornyn. Cornyn would win reelection with 54.8% to Noriega's 42.8%.

Early life and education
Noriega was born and raised in Houston. After graduating from Mount Carmel High School he attended Alvin Community College on a Rusk Athletic Scholarship where he played baseball. Noriega graduated from the University of Houston in 1984 with an ROTC Scholarship and was commissioned as a second lieutenant.

He graduated from Harvard University's John F. Kennedy School of Government in 1990. He also earned a certificate in advanced international affairs from the George Bush School at Texas A&M University. Noriega is also a graduate of the University of North Carolina's Certified Government Chief Information Officer Program. He graduated from the US Army War College where he completed his assignment as a Senior Fellow at the University of Texas. He also is a graduate of the
U.S. Army Command and General Staff College,

Military service
Noriega joined the United States Army in 1979 in the wake of the Iran hostage crisis.  He became an officer in the Texas Army National Guard in 1984, and served in the Afghanistan War that followed the September 11, 2001 attacks.

On his return from Afghanistan, Mayor Bill White requested that Noriega command the evacuee shelter operation at the George Brown Convention Center in Houston, where he oversaw thousands of Hurricane Katrina evacuees. Noriega then commanded the Laredo Sector working with U.S. Border Patrol during Operation Jump Start.

Noriega's awards include: the Combat Infantryman Badge; Senior Parachutist Badge; Distinguished Service Medal; Legion of Merit; Meritorious Service Medal; Army Commendation Medal; Army Achievement Medal; Afghanistan Campaign Medal; and Global War on Terrorism Expeditionary Medal.,; the Legion of Merit; and the German Armed Forces Gold Badge for Military Proficiency.

Public service
Noriega was a project manager for Communities in Schools, and taught in the Houston Independent School District and in the Houston Community College System before becoming a staff member for the Texas State Senate.  In 1993 he joined the Government Affairs Department of Houston Industries, Inc. (now CenterPoint Energy, Inc.).  He became a manager in the company's Economic Development Department after winning the Democratic nomination for Texas State Representative.

Noriega was elected to the Texas House of Representatives in 1998 and served five terms, 1999 to 2009.  He acted as the Budget and Oversight Chair of the Defense Affairs and State-Federal Relations Committee, and also sat on the Appropriations Committee.

Noriega's House district was mostly Hispanic and low income, and included many residents who never completed high school.

He authored and sponsored more than 100 bills in the Texas Legislature. His major legislative accomplishment was authoring House Bill 1403, The Texas Dream Act, in 2001. The bill made Texas the first state to offer in-state tuition rates and financial assistance for immigrant children and started a national movement; today, 17 states have similar laws, providing access to higher education to thousands.

Noriega was selected to serve on the Military Leadership Diversity Commission by the Obama Administration which authored its March 15, 2011 report, "From Representation to Inclusion: Diversity Leadership for the 20th Century Military."

2008 U.S. Senate campaign

Noriega narrowly avoided a runoff election by receiving 51 percent of the vote in the March 4, 2008 Democratic primary. His opponents were Gene Kelly (a perennial candidate), Ray McMurrey, and Rhett Smith. Prior to the filing deadline, trial attorney Mikal Watts withdrew from his bid for the Democratic nomination on October 23, 2007. Noriega faced Republican incumbent John Cornyn, who outraised him financially and who received 81 percent of the vote in the Republican primary, in the November 4 general election. Noriega was ultimately defeated by Cornyn in the general election.

Personal life 
Noriega is a Mexican American and the father of two sons.

Election results

2008 United States Senate

2006 State House 145

2004 State House 145

2002 State House 145

2000 State House 145

1998 State House 145

Issues

Economy
Noriega proposed a comprehensive plan to help struggling families keep their homes during the 2008 economic downturn, focusing on revamping bankruptcy law, increased funding of counseling for struggling homeowners, and a tax credit of $2000 for homeowners who refinance into a fixed-rate loan. He also proposed funding to allow homeowners to refinance into FHA (Federal Housing Administration) backed loans, which generally provide lower rates of interest than private commercial loans.

Domestic security and immigration
Noriega served the National Guard as commander of the Laredo sector during Operation Jump Start, which deployed approximately 18,000 Guardsmen to the US/Mexico border in 2006 to provide increased border security until an improved immigration reform package could be approved on Capitol Hill.  Noriega focused on curtailing human trafficking and drug smuggling at the border, and called for more advanced surveillance technology to be deployed at the border as well as for more Guardsmen to be deployed there.  Noriega opposed the use of a border fence to curb illegal immigration and trafficking.

Noriega also authored HB 2546, a bill passed by the Texas legislature that restricts the sale of ammonium nitrate in order to prevent its use in criminal or terrorist activity such as the Oklahoma City bombing.

Post-Senate race activities
In 2011 Noriega, then a colonel, was named commander of the Texas National Guard's 71st Theater Information Operations Group.

Noriega was selected for promotion to brigadier general in 2013 and assigned as Assistant Division Commander—Support for the 36th Infantry Division. He then served as the Assistant Adjutant General-Army for the Texas National Guard. Noriega retired effective January 31, 2018, and received an honorific promotion to major general on the state's retired list of National Guard officers.

In his civilian career Noriega was Chief Executive Officer of the Ronald McDonald House Houston, a non-profit organization that offers a home away from home for critically ill children receiving treatment and care in the Texas Medical Center. Effective September, 2020, Noriega became the Chief Information Officer for 
Harris County, Texas, the third most populous county in the United States.

See also

 History of the Mexican-Americans in Houston

References

External links
Rick Noriega for U.S. Senate official campaign website
Biography from the Texas House of Representatives
 
Campaign contributions at OpenSecrets.org

 Noriega, Rick and Jane Ely. Rick Noriega Oral History, Houston Oral History Project, May 7, 2008.
 

1958 births
21st-century American politicians
United States Army personnel of the War in Afghanistan (2001–2021)
Hispanic and Latino American state legislators in Texas
Harvard Kennedy School alumni
Living people
Democratic Party members of the Texas House of Representatives
National Guard (United States) generals
Military personnel from Houston
United States Army generals
University of Houston alumni